Estadio Parque Artigas is a multi-use stadium in Paysandú, Uruguay.  It is currently used mostly for football matches of Paysandú F.C.  The stadium holds 25,000 and was built in 1995. It hosted matches during the 1995 Copa America.

References

Parque Artigas
Parque Artigas
Copa América stadiums
Sports venues completed in 1994
1994 establishments in Uruguay
Buildings and structures in Paysandú Department
José Gervasio Artigas
Sport in Paysandú